Cirrochroa malaya is an Indomalayan species of heliconiine butterfly described by Cajetan and Rudolf Felder in 1860.

Subspecies
Cirrochroa malaya malaya (Peninsular Malaysia, Sumatra)
Cirrochroa malaya calypso Wallace, 1869 (Borneo)
Cirrochroa malaya natuna Fruhstorfer, 1904 (Natuna Island)

References

Vagrantini
Butterflies described in 1860
Butterflies of Asia
Taxa named by Baron Cajetan von Felder
Taxa named by Rudolf Felder